2 Kings is a collaborative studio album by Nigerian rappers Olamide and Phyno. It was released through Cloud 9 and the iTunes Store with little announcement on 1 April 2015, by Penthauze Music and YBNL Nation. The album features collaborations with producers and guest artists such as Wizkid, Lil Kesh, Storm Rex, Pheelz, Major Bangz, B.Banks and Young John. Prior to recording the album, Olamide and Phyno frequently collaborated with each other on several songs, including "Ghost Mode" and "Dope Money". The album produced the singles "Une" and "Confam Ni", both of which were released in the months leading to the album's release.

Background
Olamide first announced plans for a collaborative project with Phyno in January 2014. The album was initially scheduled for release in 2014, but was pushed back. While speaking to Yaw of Wazobia FM in October 2014, Olamide said the album was still being worked on.

Singles
Phyno released the album's lead single "Une" on 5 February 2015. Olamide released the album's second single "Confam Ni" on 8 March 2015. The song features vocals from Wizkid and was produced by Young John.

Critical reception
2 Kings received generally positive reviews from music critics and consumers. Jim Donnett awarded the album 4 stars out of 5, characterizing it as "the battle axe, crafted and fashioned for the reawakening purpose" and commending Olamide and Phyno for "breaking the fetters and reigning supreme as kings." Ayomide Tayo of Pulse Nigeria granted the album 3.5 stars out of 5, describing it as a "project that had more promise and potential than impact" while applauding both rappers for not taking the "let's play it safe" approach. A writer for music blog Jaguda described the album as a "classic masterpiece" and commended its production and length.

Track listing

Personnel
Credits adapted from the album's cover.

Olamide Adedeji - Primary artist, writer
Azubuike Nelson - Primary artist, writer
Ayodeji Balogun - Featured artist, writer
Lil Kesh - Featured artist, writer
Storm Rex - Featured artist, writer
Pheelz - Producer 
Major Bangz - Producer
B.Banks - Producer
Young John - Producer

Release history

References

2015 albums
Olamide albums
Phyno albums
Albums produced by Pheelz
Albums produced by Major Bangz
Yoruba-language albums
Igbo rap albums
Collaborative albums
Albums produced by Young John (producer)
Albums produced by B.Banks